William Christopher Winter (born December 27, 1972) is an American sleep researcher, neurologist, author, and authority regarding sleep and athletic performance. A 2010 article in Trail Runner magazine described Winter as "the leading expert in the field of sleep disruption, in athletes and issues related to travel." He is credited with coining the term circadian advantage after studying the effects of travel on Major League Baseball teams. He studied the effect of sleep timing preference on Major League Baseball pitcher performance, and hitting performance. In 2013, his research linked the sleepiness of Major League Baseball player to a reduced career longevity. This work led to research into sleepiness as a predictor of NFL Draft value in which the sleep of 560 Atlantic Coast Conference (ACC) football players and their eventual draft success was studied.

To date, he has advised numerous professional athletic organizations, most notably the San Francisco Giants who publicly commented on his role with their club in 2012 and 2014. It has been documented that he has also worked with the Oklahoma City Thunder, New York Rangers and the Los Angeles Dodgers with this latter reference referring to Winter's work with athletic sleep to be the "Best Secret Weapon [in Sports]." More recently, Winter's work was linked to the Philadelphia Phillies in the 2022 World Series. Winter, described as "sleep whisperer" is referenced repeatedly by Arianna Huffington in her 2016 book The Sleep Revolution: Transforming Your Life, One Night at a Time.

Winter's debut book, The Sleep Solution: Why Your Sleep is Broken and How to Fix It, was released by Penguin Random House on April 4, 2017. Winter announced the upcoming publication of his second book, The Rested Child: Why Your Tired, Wired, or Irritable Child May Have a Sleep Disorder--and How to Help. The book was released by Penguin Random House August 17, 2021. Winter also hosts a podcast entitled Sleep Unplugged.

The Sleep Solution

The Sleep Solution: Why Your Sleep Is Broken and How To Fix It is a science book about sleep by neurologist W. Christopher Winter,  who specializes in sleep and performance.

The book was released on April 4, 2017, to favorable reviews. A review in Refinery 29 stated, "Dr. Winter's first book, The Sleep Solution: Why Your Sleep Is Broken And How To Fix It, is already being hailed as a "solution" to insomnia. It's a no-nonsense, colloquial approach to sleep difficulties that aims to change the narrative around sleep in order to make it more manageable." Kirkus Reviews wrote, "The rare book that may help sufferers of poor sleep improve their quality of rest simply by elucidating the context of good sleep and offering the right techniques to achieve it." Publishers Weekly wrote, "As a neurologist specializing in sleep issues, Winter certainly has good credentials to back up his promise to readers that they’ll finish his book with a newfound sense of what it means to have healthy sleep." In November 2018, NY Magazine named the book one of the top 7 books for understanding sleep and the best book for insomnia. The book received favorable international press both in Ireland and the Netherlands

Time published an excerpt from the book on April 26, 2017.

Selected publications

References

External links

1972 births
Living people
Writers from Roanoke, Virginia
University of Virginia alumni
Physicians from Virginia
American neurologists
Sleep researchers